Digital holography refers to the acquisition and processing of holograms with a digital sensor array, typically a CCD camera or a similar device. Image rendering, or reconstruction of object data is performed numerically from digitized interferograms. Digital holography offers a means of measuring optical phase data and typically delivers three-dimensional surface or optical thickness images. Several recording and processing schemes have been developed to assess optical wave characteristics such as amplitude, phase, and polarization state, which make digital holography a very powerful method for metrology applications
.

Digital recording and processing of holograms

Off-axis configuration
In the off-axis configuration, a small angle between the reference and the object beams is used to prevent overlapping of the cross-beating contributions between the object and reference optical fields with the self-beating contributions of these fields. These discoveries were made by Emmett Leith and Juris Upatnieks for analog holography, and subsequently adapted to digital holography. In this configuration, only a single recorded digital interferogram is required for image reconstruction. Yet, this configuration can also be used in conjunction with temporal modulation methods, such as phase-shifting and frequency-shifting for high sensitivity measurements in low light.

Phase-shifting holography
The phase-shifting (or phase-stepped) digital holography process entails capturing multiple interferograms that each indicate the optical phase relationships between light returned from all points on the illuminated object and a controlled reference beam of light. The optical phase of the reference beam is shifted from one sampled interferogram to the next. From a linear combination of these interferograms, complex-valued holograms are formed. These holograms contain amplitude and phase information of the optical radiation diffracted by the object, in the sensor plane.

Frequency-shifting holography
Through the use of electro-optic modulators (Pockel cells) or acousto-optic modulators (Bragg cells), the reference laser beam can be frequency-shifted by a tunable quantity. This enables optical heterodyne detection, a frequency-conversion process aimed at shifting a given radiofrequency optical signal component in the sensor's temporal bandwidth. Frequency-shifted holograms can be used for narrowband laser Doppler imaging.

Multiplexing of holograms
Addressing simultaneously distinct domains of the temporal and spatial bandwidth of holograms was performed with success for angular, wavelength, space-division, polarization, and sideband  multiplexing schemes. Digital holograms can be numerically multiplexed and demultiplexed for efficient storage and transmission. Amplitude and phase can be correctly recovered.

Super-resolution in Digital Holography
Super-resolution is possible by means of a dynamic phase diffraction grating for increasing synthetically the aperture of the CCD array. Super-localization of particles can be achieved by adopting an optics/data-processing co-design scheme.

Optical Sectioning in Digital Holography
Optical sectioning, also known as sectional image reconstruction, is the process of recovering a planar image at a particular axial depth from a three-dimensional digital hologram. Various mathematical techniques have been used to solve this problem, with inverse imaging among the most versatile.

Extending Depth-of-Focus by Digital Holography in Microscopy
By using the 3D imaging capability of Digital Holography in amplitude and phase it is possible to extend the depth of focus in microscopy.

Combining of holograms and interferometric microscopy
The digital analysis of a set of holograms recorded from different directions or with different direction of the reference wave allows the numerical emulation of an
objective with large numerical aperture, leading to corresponding enhancement of the resolution.
This technique is called interferometric microscopy.

See also 
Computer generated holography
Digital holographic microscopy
Holographic interferometry
Holography

References

Further reading

Holography